Dairyūgawa Kazuo (born 21 January 1946 as Kazuo Wada) is a former sumo wrestler from Kakogawa, Hyōgo, Japan. He made his professional debut in September January 1961, and reached the top division in September 1968. His highest rank was maegashira 1. Upon retirement from active competition, he became an elder in the Japan Sumo Association, under the name Kiyomigata. He reached the Sumo Association's mandatory retirement age in January 2011.

Career record

See also
Glossary of sumo terms
List of past sumo wrestlers

References

1946 births
Living people
Japanese sumo wrestlers
Sumo people from Hyōgo Prefecture